This article contains information about the literary events and publications of 1780.

Events
September/October – Richard Brinsley Sheridan is elected to Parliament in the 1780 British general election.
December – Karl von Marinelli becomes head of the Schultz theatre company (Schultzsche Gesellschaft) of Baden.
unknown dates
Det Dramatiske Selskab in Christiania, an amateur acting troupe, is formed and gives the first regular stage performances in Norway.
A legal deposit law entitles the Załuski Library in Warsaw to a copy of every book published in the Polish–Lithuanian Commonwealth.

New books

Fiction
Elizabeth Blower – The Parsonage House
Herbert Croft – Love and Madness
Georgiana, Duchess of Devonshire – The Sylph
Thomas Holcroft – Alwyn
Samuel Jackson Pratt – Emma Corbett, or, The miseries of civil war

Children
Mrs. Trimmer – An Easy Introduction to the Knowledge of Nature, and Reading the Holy Scriptures. Adapted to the Capacities of Children

Drama
Hannah Cowley – The Belle's Stratagem
Sophia Lee – The Chapter of Accidents
Isaac Reed – A Select Collection of Old Plays (from Robert Dodsley's press)

Poetry

Hannah Cowley – The Maid of Aragon
George Crabbe – The Candidate
Herbert Croft – The Abbey of Kilkhampton; or, Monumental Records for the Year 1980 (satire)
Susannah Harrison – Songs in the Night
William Hayley – An Essay on History
Anna Seward – Elegy on Captain Cook
Christoph Martin Wieland – Oberon

Non-fiction
William Beckford – Biographical Memoirs of Extraordinary Painters
Jacob Bryant – An Address to Dr. Priestley
Edmund Burke – Speech on Oeconomical Reformation
Giacomo Casanova – Opuscoli miscellanei (containing Il duello and Lettere della nobil donna Silvia Belegno alla nobil donzella Laura Gussoni)
William Combe – Letters of the Late Lord Lyttelton (forgeries)
Martin Madan – Thelyphthora (in favor of polygamy)
Johannes von Müller – Geschichten der Schweizer
John Nichols – A Select Collection of Poems
Richard Price – An Essay on the Population of England
Joseph Priestley – Letters to a Philosophical Unbeliever
William Shakespeare – Supplement to the Edition of Shakespeare's Plays Published in 1778 by Samuel Johnson and George Steevens (by Edmond Malone)
Horace Walpole – On Modern Gardening
John Wesley – Reflections on the Rise and Progress of the American Rebellion
Arthur Young – A Tour in Ireland

Births
March 6 – Lucy Barnes, American writer (died 1809)
March 10 – Frances Trollope, English novelist (died 1863)
June 1 – Carl von Clausewitz, German soldier and military historian and theorist (died 1831)
June 3 – William Hone, English satirist (died 1842)
August 14 – George Croly, Irish poet, novelist and historian (died 1860)
November 27 – William Cardell, American grammarian and writer of boys' stories (died 1828)
December 20 – John Wilson Croker, Irish statesman and author (died 1857)
December 26 – Mary Somerville, Scottish science writer and polymath (died 1872)
probable
Maria Elizabeth Budden, English novelist and writer of didactic children's books (died 1832)
Anna Maria Porter, English poet and novelist (died 1832)

Deaths
January 31 – Jonathan Carver, American explorer and writer (born 1710)
February 14 – William Blackstone, English jurist and legal author (born 1723)
February 17 – Andreas Felix von Oefele, German historian and librarian (born 1706)
April 29 – Claude Joseph Dorat, "Le Chevalier Dorat", French poet and novelist (born 1734)
May 11 – Nicolas Fernández de Moratín, Spanish literary reformer (born 1737)
July 14 – Charles Batteux, French philosopher (born 1713)
September 4 – Sir John Fielding, English social reformer and half-brother of Henry Fielding (born 1721)
September 8 – Jeanne-Marie Leprince de Beaumont, French novelist (born 1711)
September 23 – Marie Anne de Vichy-Chamrond, marquise du Deffand, French salon hostess (born 1697)
December 22 – James Harris, English grammarian (born 1709)

References

 
Years of the 18th century in literature